Ghodrat Bahadori (born 4 February 1990) is an Iranian professional futsal coach and player. He is currently Player-coach of Farsh Ara in the Iranian Futsal Super League.

Honours

Country 
 FIFA Futsal World Cup
 Third place (1): 2016
 AFC Futsal Championship
 Champion (1): 2016
 Runners-up (1): 2014
 Asian Indoor and Martial Arts Games
 Champion (1): 2013
 WAFF Futsal Championship
 Champion (1): 2012
 Grand Prix
 Runner-Up (1): 2015

Club 
 AFC Futsal Club Championship
 Champion (1): 2015 (Tasisat Daryaei)
 Runner-Up (1): 2016 (Naft Al Wasat)
 Iranian Futsal Super League
 Champion (1): 2015–16 (Tasisat Daryaei)
 Runner-Up (1): 2020–21 (Giti Pasand)
 Iraq Futsal League champions
 Champion (3): 2015–16 (Naft Al Wasat) - 2016–17 (Naft Al Wasat) - 2017–18 (Naft Al Wasat)

References

External links 
 

1988 births
Living people
Sportspeople from Mashhad
People from Mashhad
Iranian men's futsal players
Futsal forwards
Elmo Adab FSC players
Firooz Sofeh FSC players
Farsh Ara FSC players
Place of birth missing (living people)
Tasisat Daryaei FSC players
Giti Pasand FSC players
Iranian expatriate futsal players
Iranian expatriate sportspeople in Iraq
Iranian expatriate sportspeople in China
Iranian futsal coaches